Elena Tatarkova or Olena Tatarkova (Ukrainian: Олена Tатаркова, born 22 August 1976) is a former professional tennis player from Ukraine.

She won four doubles titles on WTA Tour, and four singles and 25 doubles titles on the ITF Women's Circuit. Her best career result came in doubles; she reached the 1999 Wimbledon final with partner Mariaan de Swardt, which they lost to Lindsay Davenport and Corina Morariu. Tatarkova also made the 2001 French Open doubles semifinals with Justine Henin. She reached a career-high singles ranking of world No. 45, and highest doubles ranking of No. 9, both in 1999.

Since retiring from professional tennis in 2004, she married Timothy Feltham in September 2007 and is mother to Stanley (Apr 2009) and Austin (Feb 2012)

Grand Slam performance timelines

Singles

Doubles

Grand Slam tournament finals

Doubles: 1 (runner-up)

WTA career finals

Doubles: 12 (4 titles, 8 runner-ups)

ITF Circuit finals

Singles: 11 (4–7)

Doubles: 36 (25–11)

Top 10 wins

External links
 
 
 

Ukrainian female tennis players
1976 births
Living people
Sportspeople from Dushanbe
Olympic tennis players of Ukraine
Tennis players at the 2000 Summer Olympics